is a 2011 film in the Kamen Rider series that was directed by Koichi Sakamoto. It features the casts of Kamen Rider Fourze and Kamen Rider OOO, and opened in Japanese theaters on December 10, 2011.

Plot

Beginning: Fight! Legendary Seven Riders
Meteorites carrying a mysterious substance called SOLU fall to Earth. The original seven Kamen Riders – One, Two, V3, Riderman, X, Amazon, and Stronger – battle Foundation X's monsters around the world, but fail to stop the organization from retrieving the SOLU.

OOO: Ankh's Resurrection, the Medals of the Future, and the Leading Hope
As one of the meteorites causes a time portal to open over Japan, Kamen Rider Poseidon emerges from 40 years in the future to fight the present day Kamen Riders. Kougami Foundation employee Erika Satonaka informs her friend Hina Izumi of the event while they head to the airport to pick up Eiji Hino. Hino rescues them from attacking monsters, but Poseidon attacks him before Satonaka's partners Akira Date and Shintaro Goto arrive to fight the mysterious Rider. Poseidon overpowers them as Hino reveals himself to be a resurrected Ankh while pulling several Core Medals out of Poseidon's body just as the real Hino arrives and weakens the enemy, though Poseidon escapes.

With Date and Goto hospitalized, Hino, Ankh, Izumi, and Satonaka regroup at the restaurant Cous Coussier, where Ankh refuses to explain how he was revived while Hino theorizes Poseidon might not be acting of his own free will. More monsters attack, forcing Hino and Ankh to fight them while Izumi and Chiyoko Shiraishi evacuate the restaurant. Poseidon returns and nearly kills Hino, but the person inside the armor stops the former and reveals he is Michal Minato, a heroic Kamen Rider from the future whose aquaphobia led to him being corrupted by several dozen Core Medals that emerged from a black hole and created Poseidon. Ankh retrieves more Core Medals from him before Poseidon separates himself from Minato in an attempt to travel to another time period, though he is destroyed by Hino and Minato. After Minato leaves, Izumi notices that Ankh disappeared. Hino reveals that the Ankh that fought with them also came from the future. Before they can leave, Lem Kannagi attacks them and steals Poseidon's personal Core Medals.

Fuuto, The Conspiracy Advances: Gallant! Kamen Rider Joker
In the city of Fuuto, Shotaro Hidari stops a Foundation X convoy and destroys the monsters guarding it, though he causes the SOLU they were carrying to leak into a sewer. Meanwhile, Kannagi and his aides arrive at a secret airport to board his mobile spaceship lab, Exodus. The original seven Riders arrive to stop him, but Kannagi captures them.

Fourze: Nadeshi-Ko Ad-Vent
During Amanogawa High School's cultural festival, the Kamen Rider Club puts on a presentation celebrating past Kamen Riders when a mysterious girl falls from the sky. Club member Gentaro Kisaragi saves her before joining the club in taking her to the hospital, where they learn her name is Nadeshiko Misaki before Dustards attempt to kidnap her. As Kisaragi transforms into Kamen Rider Fourze to stop them, Misaki transforms into Kamen Rider Nadeshiko. Soon after, the Virgo Zodiarts arrives demanding Misaki, but Kisaragi and Misaki drive her off. Kisaragi's friend Kengo Utahoshi asks where Misaki's Rider powers came from, but she runs off with Kisaragi, who takes her to the club's lunar headquarters, the Rabbit Hatch, where they grow closer. When Misaki takes off her space helmet to kiss him, Kisaragi realizes she is not human.

Utahoshi reveals that she is one of several Seeds Of Life from the Universe, or "SOLU", an alien lifeform that mimics what it sees and lacks a true consciousness, and college scientists have apparently come to study her. Kisaragi refuses to accept this and storms off. His childhood friend Yuki Jojima cheers him up, but he refuses to let Misaki go and takes her away from the scientists. Misaki is touched by his feelings, but the scientists reveal themselves as Foundation X agents and kidnap her. Kisaragi pursues them, but Kannagi's aide Katal impedes him. Misaki and Kisaragi's ally Shun Daimonji join the fight when Foundation X reinforcements arrive. The trio defeats them, but Kannagi captures Misaki and turns her into a SOLU Switch before defeating Kisaragi and leaving him at Katal's mercy. Kisaragi uses an Astroswitch that Misaki created to destroy Katal. Soon after, Hino arrives to ask for Kisaragi's help in defeating Foundation X.

Movie War Mega Max: Gather! Warriors of Glory
Meeting up with Hidari and his partner Philip, Kisaragi and Hino learn that Kannagi betrayed Foundation X to achieve world domination. As Kannagi's forces confront the Riders, Hidari and Philip stay behind to hold them off and repay Hino for helping them during NEVER's attack on Fuuto while Hino and Kisaragi pursue Kannagi, finding and freeing the captive seven Riders on the way. As the seven Riders offer to stay behind and hold off Kannagi's forces, Minato returns to give Hino three Core Medals from his time to assist in the mission. Hino and Kisaragi reach the Exodus, where Kannagi uses Poseidon's Core Medals, the SOLU Switch, and the Gingaoh Driver to transform into Super Gingaoh and overpower the Riders. Hino and Kisaragi use the future Core Medals and Misaki's Astroswitch respectively, to fight Kannagi on equal footing before destroying him and the Exodus. Becoming an energy being, Misaki returns to space while the Riders return to Earth. As Hino resumes his journey to resurrect Ankh, Kisaragi encounters the real Misaki on his way back to school.

In a post-credits scene, Kamen Rider Meteor defeats Kannagi's forces' remnants before wondering whether he will find his target at Amanogawa High School.

Production
Movie War Mega Max features the first seven Kamen Riders (One, Two, V3, Riderman, X, Amazon, and Stronger) to commemorate the franchise's 40th anniversary,  as well as the return of Kamen Rider Double. Unlike previous Movie War films, which were divided into 3 segments, Movie War Mega Max is divided into 5 parts. Similarly to previous Movie War films, the secondary Kamen Rider of Kamen Rider Fourze, Kamen Rider Meteor, makes his debut in the film.

Cast
 Beginning cast
 : 
 : 
 : 
 : 
 : 
 : 
 : 
 : 
 : 
 : 
 : 

 OOO cast
 : 
 : 
 : 
 : 
 : 
 : 
 : 
 : 
 : 
 : 
 O-Scanner Voice, Poseidon Driver Voice, Gingaoh Driver Voice: 
 Birth Driver Voice: 

Futo, The Conspiracy Advances cast
 : 
 : 
 Gaia Memory Voice: 

 Fourze cast
 : 
 : 
 : 
 : 
 : 
 : 
 : 
 : 
 Mysterious high school student: 
 : 
 : 
 :

Theme songs
Main film theme
 "SAMURAI STRONG STYLE"
 Lyrics: Show Ayanocozey
 Composition & Arrangement: Marty Friedman
 Artist:  vs. 
 The movie's theme. Show Ayanocozey of Kishidan (a.k.a. DJ OZMA) and former Megadeth guitarist Marty Friedman recorded the Mega Max theme song "SAMURAI STRONG STYLE". Ayanocozey said that he had been a fan of the Kamen Rider Series when he was younger, having watched Super-1 and Black, and became envious that Koji Kikkawa had become involved in the Kamen Rider Series as a musician. To him, the meaning behind the song was the unique heroism that the Japanese idolize, and planned to style the song in the same way Ichirou Mizuki and Akira Kushida have done for their hero show theme songs. He has also stated his pleasure in collaborating with Friedman, as he was a fan of Megadeth in junior high. Friedman was pleased with his collaboration with Ayanocozey, having previously worked with him on a Fanta commercial campaign, and stated that the song has an ultimate manly feel to it. "SAMURAI STRONG STYLE" was released on December 21, 2011, alongside the film's soundtrack and the television series' soundtrack.
Insert songs
 "Anything Goes! OOO Special Edit."
 Lyrics: Shoko Fujibayashi
 Composition: tatsuo (of everset and Galveston 19)
 Arrangement: tatsuo & Kōtarō Nakagawa
 Artist:  × Eiji Hino (Shu Watanabe)
 "Shout out"
Lyrics: Shoko Fujibayashi
Composition & Arrangement: Shuhei Naruse
Artist: Eiji Hino (Shu Watanabe)
"Shout Out" makes its debut in the film, having never been used in the Kamen Rider OOO broadcast run.

Reception

Kamen Rider × Kamen Rider Fourze & OOO: Movie War Mega Max grossed $16,458,957 at the box office.

Notes

References

External links

Fourze and OOO: Movie War Mega Max
2011 films
Crossover tokusatsu films
Films directed by Koichi Sakamoto
Movie
2010s Japanese-language films